Think Big is a 1990 American adventure comedy film directed by Jon Turteltaub (in his directorial debut) and starring the "Barbarian Brothers" Peter and David Paul.

Plot
Rafe and Victor are two truckers who have had a bad run of luck. The film begins with the two rushing through traffic to get a pregnant woman to the hospital whilst avoiding a repo man after their truck. They then go their boss, who chastises the pair for yet another missed deadline. Their boss then says they have one final chance, from the company Tech Star which is scheduled to ship barrels of toxic waste to California. As a safeguard against the brothers' supposed incompetence, their boss installs a countdown time on their dashboard, a.k.a. "the foul-up clock", to remind them of the deadline. Victor and Rafe travel to Tech Star, which is a company that uses child geniuses as slave labor. One such slave, named Holly, has invented a device that activates and deactivates electronics by code, and looks like an ordinary remote control. While the brothers are loading their truck, Holly stows away in the cab, having learned the shipment is destined to the same place where her fiancée lives. She is soon discovered, and while Rafe and Victor agree to protect her, they fail to understand her invention. They spent the night in a Texas motel, nearly eluding Dr. Bruekner, the CEO of Tech Star, and his hired goons, who attempt to recapture Holly as her invention is Tech Star property. Later, the brothers' truck stalls on the railroad tracks as a train is approaching. Holly struggles to remember the right code to restart the truck's engine with her invention, doing so at the last minute, but the trio fails to realize that she inadvertently entered a code that reprogrammed the foul-up clock. Arriving in California, the trio is captured, and Holly destroys her invention. As they are making their way to her boyfriend's house, Victor presents Holly with the invention. Unaware how that can be, the brothers realized something like this may have happened and switched her invention with an ordinary remote from the motel. She praises them for their foresight, but when they arrive, her boyfriend remarks they still have a couple of hours to make the delivery. Rafe remembers the ship is to depart at 7, not 9, and the foul-up clock "fouled up"! The pair rushes to the dock, but miss the ship. To make matters worse with their evident termination, the repo man who was after them at the beginning successfully repossesses their truck. However, in doing so, he failed to realize that the toxic barrels from Tech Star were still inside, and does not show proper precautions, rupturing the barrels and releasing them chemicals. He realizes too late what has happened when his hair starts falling out in tufts.
Holly, however, markets her invention and makes considerable amounts of money. She then partners with Rafe and Victor into making their own transportation company. The film ends with the brothers getting a CB message from Holly about a client, and set off in a brand new tractor trailer to begin their shipment.

Cast
Peter Paul as Rafe
David Paul as Victor
Martin Mull as Dr. Hayden Bruekner
Ari Meyers as Holly Sherwood
Claudia Christian as Dr. Irene Marsh
Richard Kiel as Irving
Richard Moll as Thornton
Michael Winslow as Hap
Peter Lupus as Bad Guy #1
Thomas Gottschalk as Mr. Roberts
David Carradine as Sweeney
Tony Longo as Supervisor
Sal Landi as Bad Guy #2
Tommy 'Tiny' Lister as 'Z'
Rafer Johnson as Johnson
Jimmy Briscoe as Jimmy
Darcy LaPier as Donna

References

External links

1990 comedy films
1990 directorial debut films
1990 films
1990s adventure comedy films
American adventure comedy films
Films directed by Jon Turteltaub
Trucker films
1990s English-language films
1990s American films